Biji is a genre in classical Chinese literature. It roughly translates "notebook". A book of biji can contain anecdotes, quotations, random musings, philological speculations, literary criticism and indeed everything that the author deems worth recording. The genre first appeared during the Wei and Jin dynasties, and matured during the Tang Dynasty. The biji of that period of time mostly contains the believe-it-or-not kind of anecdotes, and many of them can be treated as collections of short fictions. To differentiate this kind of "biji fiction" from the general biji, the former is later called "biji xiaoshuo" (筆記小說 "notebook fictions"). Biji flourished during the Song Dynasty, and continued to flourish during the later dynasties.

Famous works of biji include: 
Miscellaneous Morsels from Youyang (酉陽雜俎 Yǒuyáng Zázǔ), by Duan Chengshi, Tang Dynasty
Dream Pool Essays (夢溪筆談 Mèngxī Bǐtán) by Shen Kua, Song Dynasty
Notebooks from the Rong Study (容齋隨筆 Róngzhāi Suíbǐ) by Hong Mai, Song Dynasty
Little Notes on the Nature of Things (物理小識 Wùlǐ Xiǎoshí) by Fang Yizhi, Ming Dynasty

See also 

 Commonplace book

References
Ronald Egan 'Introduction' in Qian Zhongshu Limited Views: Essays on Ideas and Letters Harvard University Press, 1998 Ronald Egan trans.

Chinese literature
Chinese literary genres
Literary genres